BZK or variant, may refer to:

 Benzalkonium, a quaternary ammonium cation, frequently used as a biocidal cleanser

Groups and organizations
 BZK, a cleaning supply and sanitizer company
 Billy Ze Kick, a French rock band
 Ministry of the Interior and Kingdom Relations of the Netherlands (BZK), a government ministry
 BZK (cycling team), former name of the women's pro team Glas–Smurfit Kappa
 Beijing Zhonghuan Kinetics Heavy Vehicles Co. Ltd (BZK), a subsidiary of ST Kinetics

Places
 Bryansk International Airport (IATA airport code: BZK; ICAO airport code: UUBP), Bryansk Oblast, Russia
 Bhaini Khurd station (rail code: BZK), Karnal, Haryana, India; a rail station, see List of railway stations in Haryana

Other uses
 Miskito Coast Creole (ISO 639 language code: bzk)
 BzK galaxy, a photometric galaxy classification
 BzK, a Czech artillery designation, see List of artillery by type
 BZK, a PRC military designation for UAVs, see List of unmanned aerial vehicles of China

See also

 

ميدارظثتى

مثنلنقنلطقلظ.ز مبم